Bitexco Financial Tower is a skyscraper in Ho Chi Minh City, Vietnam. At its completion in 2010, it became the tallest building in Vietnam and kept this status until January 2011, when it was surpassed by Keangnam Hanoi Landmark Tower.

The tower is owned by Bitexco Group, a Vietnamese multi-industry corporation, with a focus on real estate development. The building also houses the Ho Chi Minh City office of Bitexco Group, while its headquarters are in Hanoi.

The tower was designed by Carlos Zapata, Design Principal and Founder of Carlos Zapata Studio, with French company AREP as architect of record.  Designer Zapata, who was born in Venezuela but is based in New York City, drew inspiration for this skyscraper's unique shape from Vietnam's national flower, the Lotus.

The tower was officially inaugurated on 31 October 2010.  In 2013, CNN.com named the Bitexco Financial Tower one of the 25 Great Skyscraper Icons of Construction. And in 2015, Thrillist.com named the Bitexco Financial Tower the #2 Coolest Skyscraper in the World.

History

The groundbreaking ceremony was held in September 2005. Two years later, in June 2007, construction of the tower started. The tower topped out in mid-2010 and had its inauguration ceremony on 31 October 2010.

Reception 
Amongst other international awards and recognitions, on 30 November 2011, Bitexco Financial Tower received the "Excellence in structure engineering awards 2011" in the "International structure over $100 million" category. NCSEA.

Facilities

Bitexco Financial Tower is a mixed use project which includes office, retail, F&B and entertainment space. The tower has around 38,000 square metres of office space, from 7th to 65th floors, and a five-storey retail podium, Icon68, including a food court (which has closed following the COVID-19 pandemic) and seven screen multiplex cinema with around 10,000 square metres from Ground to 4th Floors. At Floor 49, at height around 178 metres, there is an observation deck open to the public.

Vietnam's first non-rooftop helipad is on the 52nd floor of the Bitexco Financial Tower. The helipad extends 22 meters out from the main structure. It is strong enough to carry a helicopter up to 3 tons of weight.

Key design features

 Grand Atrium Lobby
 Wall & Façade system 
The glass from Belgium was purchased and shipped to China for manufacturing.  Once in China the low iron heat strengthened glass was cut into 6,000 individual panels.  Each panel is double glazed with the outside layer being 8 mm thick and internal air space of 12 mm and an internal panel of 8 mm.  Finally the glass was shipped to Ho Chi Minh City and the panels were installed as the building grew higher. Each of the 6,000 sleek glass panels enveloping the Bitexco Financial Tower is individually cut to unique specifications because each floor is unique, giving the building its eye-catching shape.

 Helipad
Located on the southern side of the Bitexco Financial Tower, the helipad cantilevers from the 52nd floor and resembles a blossoming lotus bud.

Constructed from more than 250 tons of structural steel and requiring 4,000 ultra-strong bolts to hold it together, the helipad took almost a year to plan, build and coordinate before it could be hoisted to its place at height around 191 meters.  Its installation alone took about two months.

Most of the materials used to construct the helipad were purchased from Europe and South Korea and the manufacturing took place in Bu Gang, a city near Seoul. Once the fabrication of the helipad was completed, it was shipped to Vietnam.

To ensure proper assembly, the entire helipad was pre-assembled on the ground of a factory in Đồng Nai Province in Vietnam – a process that took about three weeks.

When the helipad was ready to be lifted into place, the roads surrounding the southern face of the Bitexco Financial Tower were closed for safety reasons and the helipad was transported into the centre of District 1.  The massive yet delicate operation of lifting the helipad began.  It was lifted in parts and attached to the 52nd storey of the Bitexco Financial Tower, 191 meters above Ho Chi Minh City.

 Vertical Transportation 
Bitexco Financial Tower operates Otis double-deck elevators with specialised Compass System which is the most modern and advanced elevator system in Vietnam. With speed up to 7 meters per second, it was the fastest lift system in South East Asia at the time of installation. There are 3 separate elevator zones servicing the tower with 14 passenger and 2 service lifts, plus further lifts to serve the retail and parking areas.

 Saigon Skydeck on 49th floor
The Saigon Skydeck soft opened for visitors from overseas and domestically on 1 January 2011, officially opening in July that same year. The observation deck offers 360-degree panoramic views of Ho Chi Minh City, guest facilities and a gift shop. Saigon Skydeck opens daily and a ticket costs around $10.

Floor plan
The following is the breakdown of floors.

Office demand in Ho Chi Minh City 
Due to the rapid economic growth of Saigon in particular and dynamic economic development of Vietnam in general, the construction of office buildings in Ho Chi Minh City has been rapid. Bitexco Financial Tower has fulfilled the need for international standard office space in this city. The unit price of prime grade offices now in Saigon can be up to US$40/metre square/per month or more, for the most demanded space. Since the opening up and growth of the Vietnamese economy, both foreign and domestic enterprises have invested significantly in the construction of high-rise buildings in Vietnam. Before 1995, Saigon city centre featured generally French Colonial and other rather basic low-lying buildings. Since then, the city has seen a dramatic increase in high-rise buildings as the country has often maintained an average 8–8.5% annual GDP growth rate. Saigon, the country's economic hub, has achieved 12% GDP growth rate, at some times, although this has been dampened in recent years by the general world recession but not as greatly as has been felt in other parts of the world.

HCMC Skyrun 
Since 2011, Bitexco Financial Tower has hosted the annual HCMC Skyrun, Vietnam's longest running stair climbing race. The race starts on the ground floor and finishes at the helipad on the 52nd floor. In 2011, Thomas Dold of Germany ran up in a time of 4 minutes 51 seconds, setting the men's course record. Italy's Valentina Belotti, climbed in a time of 6 minutes 19 seconds, setting the women's course record.

Gallery

See also

List of tallest buildings in Vietnam
Menara Telekom
Landmark 81

References

External links 

 https://web.archive.org/web/20111228045302/http://www.bitexco.com.vn/real-estate-investment/bitexco-financial-tower
 
 http://saigonskydeck.com/
 
 http://www.realestatejournal.com/columnists_com/blueprint/20070301-blueprint.html
 About the project but the information is not updated as the investor has changed the design
 article on Asia Times Online
 View of Saigon Skyline from Bitexco Building

2010 establishments in Vietnam
Office buildings completed in 2010
Skyscrapers in Ho Chi Minh City
Skyscraper office buildings in Vietnam